Officially titled the State Commission for Consideration of Issues Raised in Applications of Citizens of the USSR from among the Crimean Tatars – usually simply referred to as the "Gromyko commission" in reference to the head of the commission, Andrei Gromyko (at that time the Chairman of the Presidium of the Supreme Soviet) – was the first state commission on the subject of addressing what the dubbed "the Tatar problem". Formed in July 1987, it issued a conclusion in June 1988 rejecting all major demands of Crimean Tatar civil rights activists ranging from right of return to restoration of the Crimean ASSR.

Background 
For decades, the government maintained that their national issue had been "solved" by Decree 493 which proclaimed that "people of Tatar nationality formerly living in Crimea" were "rehabilitated" but gave no universal right of return and did not restore the Crimean ASSR in addition to normalizing the use of euphemism for the derecognized ethnic group instead of the proper ethnonym. Meanwhile, other deported peoples such as the Chechens, Ingush, Kalmyks, Balkars, and Karachays were all allowed to return to their homelands, had their titular national republics restored, and were recognized as distinct ethnic groups – things highly coveted by the Crimean Tatar civil rights movement. When pressed on the issue by outsiders, the government insisted that Crimean Tatars had equal rights and most simply did not want to return to Crimea, but maintained starkly different policy in practice; when Crimean Tatars tried to move to Crimea they were almost always denied the required propiska and could then be deported again, while non-Tatar migrants to Crimea faced no such barriers to getting permission to live in Crimea and were frequently encouraged to move there. In Uzbekistan, where most Crimean Tatars lived, those who expressed desire to move to Crimea were chastised, belittled, and reminded that Crimea was closed to them.

Initial Red Square protest and delegations 
During the early days of the Crimean Tatar civil rights movement, Crimean Tatars sent large delegations of highly respected Crimean Tatar activists and party members to Moscow to meet with Soviet leaders and ask for right of return and restoration of the Crimean ASSR. However, as time passed and the delegations accomplished nothing besides being participants being chastized for their participation, such delegations and visits to Moscow became smaller and less frequent. However, due to glasnost, Crimean Tatar activists developed a renewed interest in visiting Moscow en mass. In addition, they hoped that under reduced censorship the media would be willing to listen to and include their opinions in media coverage of the national issue instead of maintaining the line everything was fine. On 20 June 1987 the first Crimean Tatar delegates arrived in Moscow, where they visited the offices of various newspapers, magazines, and TV stations as well as the writers union and talked about their exile and requested that their letters and petitions be published, but they were typically turned down. Later on 26 June several Crimean Tatars met with Pyotr Demichev, who only agreed to tell Gorbachev about their comments. Later on in early July several dozen Crimean Tatars began picketing in Red Square holding signs calling for right of return. The size of the protests grew quickly: the picket in front of the building of the Central Committee of the CPSU on 23 July drew around 100 protesters, but the number increased to around 500 just two days later.

Formation of commission 
On 9 July 1987, after decades of the state sweeping the issue under the rug, the government finally agreed to form a commission decide the fate of the Crimean Tatar people. The day before, a small delegation of Crimean Tatars met with People's Writer of the USSR Yevgeny Yevtushenko, who encouraged Soviet leaders to give them a meeting or at least listen to them. The issue made it to discussion in the politburo, and Gorbachev, who was reluctant to make any solid decisions on the issue, decided to outsource the issue to a commission. Subsequently, Gromyko, who rarely handled domestic issues, was selected by Gorbachev to head the commission despite his extreme reluctance to meet with Crimean Tatars and his hostile attitude towards the ethnic group. In a conversation with Gorbachev, he expressed desire to ignore the Crimean Tatars entirely and keep them in places of exile as was policy for the past decades. Nevertheless, Gromyko was appointed head of the commission, and he reluctantly discussed the issue with other Soviet politicians. The leadership of the commission consisted of various senior Soviet politicians who had strong feelings on the issue including Eduard Shevardnadze, Viktor Chebrikov, Vitaly Vorotnikov, Vladimir Shcherbitsky, Inomjon Usmonxoʻjayev, Pyotr Demichev, Alexander Yakovlev, Anatoly Lukyanov, Georgy Razumovsky, but no Crimean Tatars.

Period of operation 
21 Crimean Tatar representatives eventually met in the Kremlin with Gromyko on 27 July 1987, where he expressed his contempt and failed to offer any significant concessions but demanded that the Crimean Tatars be less emotional. Compounded by the publication of the libelous announcement from TASS in central newspapers that next day about the formation of the commission, the members of the Crimean Tatar delegation were very disappointed, and became increasingly concerned that the project would be a repeat of Decree 493. Later another statement from Gromyko warning that any attempt to put pressure on state organs would not work out in their favor was republished by TASS. The commission then lasted eleven months before issuing its final statement in June 1988. Meanwhile, authorities in Crimea remained hostile to the idea of allowing Crimean Tatar right of return, and further tightened the propiska rules in Crimea as additional Crimean Tatars attempted to arrive and register in the peninsula. Meanwhile in the Uzbek SSR, the commission attempted to ascertain Crimean Tatar attitudes by holding meetings with regional Crimean Tatar diaspora populations, but expressed dismay that they expressed support for return to Crimea and restoration of the Crimean ASSR in line with the demands of those deemed "autonomists" by Soviet organs.

Central Initiative Group actions 
Despite Gromyko's warning that increased protests and other forms of public discontent would not be taken well, members of the Central Initiative Group (led by Dzhemilev) continued to remain in Moscow, holding rallies in Izmailovsky Park. Prominent representatives from the Dzhemilev faction like Sabriye Seutova, Safinar Dzhemileva, Reshat Dzhemilev, and Fuat Ablyamitov; unlike the original leaders of the Crimean Tatar national movement who were seen as "orthodox communists" and strongly rejected the idea of accepting help from abroad, many members of the Dzhemilev faction listed above, among others, openly solicited support from the West, much to the concern of mainstream Crimean Tatar civil rights activists who grew increasingly worried about the rise of the CIG and its potential to cripple the movement, as they knew very well that all Crimean Tatars would be punished with further delay of right of return for the rogue actions of members of the Central Initiative Group - which consisted disproportionately of the younger generation born in exile and had never been part of the national movement before.

Results 
Despite being sent various proposals for plans to restore the Crimean ASSR and return Crimean Tatars to Crimea, in addition to polling information of Crimean Tatars showing that a solid majority supported returning to Crimea, the requests of the Crimean Tatar community were rejected. The conclusion statement issued by Gromyko in June 1988 claimed that it was unrealistic to restore the Crimean ASSR because of the demographics of Crimea, and suggested allowing organized recruitment of a small percent of the Crimean Tatars to Crimea to work in agriculture in Crimea, but maintained that there would be no mass return of Crimean Tatars, and instead offered additional small-scale measures to "better satisfy the cultural needs" of Crimean Tatars places of exile.

Reception and aftermath 
Responses to the conclusions of the commission were overwhelmingly negative; even people the most loyal communist Crimean Tatars were disappointed by the conclusions of the commission. For example Rollan Qadiyev, by then having evolved politically to the point of meeting criticism from almost all other Crimean Tatar activists for his opposition to the rally in Red Square out of fear it would provoke authorities, expressed dismay at the idea that only a few more Crimean Tatars could be allowed to move to Crimea, which he dubbed "lottery for the homeland." He also criticized Gromyko's conclusions that the Crimean ASSR could not be restored because of demographic reasons, noting that the Kazakh SSR was formed when Kazakhs were only 13% of the population of the region. Yuri Osmanov described the commission as anti-socialist and a means of normalizing Stalinism in the perestroika era.

Barely a year after the conclusion of the commission rejecting return and restoration of the Crimean ASSR, a second commission was composed to re-evaluated the issue, but headed by Yanaev instead of Gromyko and inclusive of Crimean Tatars on the board.

References 

Politics of the Crimean Tatars